Neal E. Kravitz (born October 18, 1957) is an associate judge of the Superior Court of the District of Columbia.

Education and career 
Kravitz earned his Bachelor of Arts from Yale College and his Juris Doctor from Harvard Law School.

After graduating, he served as a law clerk for Henry A. Politz on the United States Court of Appeals for the Fifth Circuit. In 1984, Kravitz joined the Public Defender Service for the District of Columbia as a staff attorney.

D.C. Superior Court 
President Bill Clinton nominated Kravitz on May 1, 1998, to a fifteen-year term as an associate judge on the Superior Court of the District of Columbia to the seat vacated by Paul Rainey Webber, III. On September 3, 1998, the Senate Committee on Governmental Affairs held a hearing on his nomination. On September 24, 1998, the Committee reported his nomination favorably to the senate floor. On October 21, 1998, the full United States Senate confirmed his nomination by voice vote. 

On August 21, 2013, the Commission on Judicial Disabilities and Tenure recommended that President Obama reappoint him to second fifteen-year term as a judge on the D.C. Superior Court.

References

1957 births
Living people
20th-century American judges
21st-century American judges
Harvard Law School alumni
Judges of the Superior Court of the District of Columbia
People from Anniston, Alabama
Yale College alumni